In economics, the learning effect is the process by which education increases productivity and results in higher wages.

References

Education economics